Essam Abdel-Fatah (Arabic: عصام عبد الفتاح) (born December 30, 1965) is an Egyptian football (soccer) referee. Abd El Fatah has been a referee since 2001; his first international game was between Morocco and Sierra Leone in 2003. He was the referee for the match between Australia and Japan in the 2006 FIFA World Cup.

Abd El Fatah is a pilot in the Egyptian Army Air Force and he is  currently a Lieutenant Major.

References

External links 
 FIFA profile

1965 births
Living people
Egyptian football referees
FIFA World Cup referees
2006 FIFA World Cup referees